Pelechuco is a location in the La Paz Department in Bolivia. It is the seat of the Pelechuco Municipality, the second municipal section of the Franz Tamayo Province.

References 

 Instituto Nacional de Estadística de Bolivia

Populated places in La Paz Department (Bolivia)